Izabela Silva Campos (born 11 April 1981) is a Brazilian visually impaired F11/12 shot putter and discus thrower. She won a bronze medal in the discus throw at the 2016 Summer Paralympics. She qualified for the 2020 Summer Paralympics, in Women's discus throw.

Life
Campos lost her sight when she was five after having measles.

Campos competed at the 2012 Summer Paralympics in London in the women's shot put. That event was won by Assunta Legnante. At the 2016 Paralympics in Rio she threw her discus 32.60 m to get a bronze medal. She missed out to Liangmin Zhang (36.65 m) from China and Tang Hongxia (35.01 m).

She competed at the 2019 Parapan American Games, winning gold in Discus, and bronze in Javelin, and Shot put. She came twelfth in the shot put at the 2019 World Para Athletics Championships in Dubai but she took the bronze in the F11 Women's discus throw.

References

External links

 
Izabela Campos | Bronze Women’s Discus F11 | Final | London 2017 World Para Athletics Championships July 19, 2017

Living people
1981 births
Brazilian female shot putters
Brazilian female discus throwers
Visually impaired category Paralympic competitors
Athletes (track and field) at the 2016 Summer Paralympics
Athletes (track and field) at the 2020 Summer Paralympics
Paralympic bronze medalists for Brazil
Medalists at the 2016 Summer Paralympics
Paralympic medalists in athletics (track and field)
Paralympic athletes of Brazil
Brazilian blind people
Sportspeople from Belo Horizonte
21st-century Brazilian women